The old pharmacy of Hedemora (Apoteket Gustaf Wasa) is a listed yard in Hedemora, Dalarna County, Sweden. It was probably built in 1779 by the merchant Eric Hult. It became pharmacy in 1849, when pharmacist C. A. Ruth bought the yard, and served as such until 1988. It was modified in 1897 after plans by architect Lars Israel Wahlman.  the main building contains a café and a shop for building preservation equipment.

References 
Moström, Arne and Alander, Harriet (2004). Kulturpromenad Hedemora – Dalarnas äldsta stad. Hedemora kommun (in Swedish).
Olsson, Daniels Sven (1980). Bebyggelse i Hedemora stad: kulturhistorisk miljöanalys. Dalarnas museums serie av rapporter, 0348-2863 ; 11. Falun: Dalarnas mus. Sid. 41–42. Libris 7748551.  (in Swedish).

Listed buildings in Hedemora Municipality
Coffeehouses and cafés in Sweden